Nepean Township is a former incorporated and now geographic township in Eastern Ontario, Canada, now part of the City of Ottawa.

Originally known as Township D, it was established in 1792. In 1800, it became part of Carleton County and was incorporated as a township in 1850. The first settler in the township was Jehiel Collins, from Vermont, who settled in an area near the Ottawa River which later became part of Bytown. Over the years, parts of Nepean Township were annexed by the expanding city of Ottawa. The original town hall of the township of Nepean was located in Westboro, which became part of Ottawa in 1949. A new town hall was built in Bells Corners in 1966. Nepean was incorporated as a city in 1978 and became part of the amalgamated city of Ottawa in 2001.

Nepean Township took its name from Sir Evan Nepean, British Under-Secretary of State for the Home Department from 1782 to 1791.
According to the Canada 2001 Census, the Township (original boundaries) had a population of 339,708.

The 1850 boundaries of Nepean Township were the Ottawa River on the north, the Rideau River on the east, approximately along where Bankfield Road and Brophy Drive are today on the south, and approximately where Eagleson Road, March Road, and Hertzberg Road are today through to Shirleys Bay on the west.  The township included much of what is now Ottawa, all of the former City of Nepean, and parts of the former City of Kanata.  To the west of Nepean Township was Goulbourn and March Townships, to the east Gloucester Township, and to the south North Gower Township.

Reeves
 1850 - Frederick Bearman
 1850 - Chester Chapman
 1854 - John Scott
 1856 - George Bell
 1858 - Samuel Davison
 1862 - Nelson George Robinson
 1864 - Thomas Graham
 1865 - John Dawson
 1873 - Col. John Fenton Bearman
 1875 - Thomas Clark
 1886 - John Dawson
 1890 - John Boyce
 1893 - James Bearman
 1896 - George Boyce
 1897 - William Henderson 
 1897 - James Bearman
 1900 - Frederick Augustus Heney
 1905 - John George Clark 
 1906 - Frederick Augustus Heney 
 1913 - Frederick Henry Honeywell
 1916 - Bower Henry
 1919 - William Joynt
 1922 - W. Fred Bell
 1923 - Walter Lionel Graham
 1924 - Albert Bentham Ullett
 1925 - John William Arnott
 1927 - Robert Green
 1929 - Robert Ernest Nelson
 1933 - George Herbert Bradley
 1938 - Robert Mackie
 1939 - John Alexander Dawson
 1945 - Wellington Garfield Cummings
 1947 - Harry Parslow
 1949 - Thomas Campbell Keenan
 1954 - Douglas Aubrey Moodie
 1970 - Andrew S. Haydon

See also
List of townships in Ontario

References

Former municipalities now in Ottawa
Geographic townships in Ontario